The Sewall–Ware House was a historic house at 100 S. Main Street in Sherborn, Massachusetts. The house stood on land once belonging to Massachusetts judge Samuel Sewall (best known for his participation in the Salem witch trials). The house may have been constructed by Sewall's instructions for a tenant farmer. In the mid-18th century it was the boyhood home of Harvard College divinity professor Henry Ware, and remained in the Ware family well into the 19th century.

It was added to the National Register of Historic Places in 1986. The house no longer stands at the location described in the listing papers, and has probably been demolished.

See also
National Register of Historic Places listings in Sherborn, Massachusetts

References

Houses on the National Register of Historic Places in Middlesex County, Massachusetts
Houses in Sherborn, Massachusetts
National Register of Historic Places in Middlesex County, Massachusetts